Roscoe C. Vaught was the fourth head football coach at Kentucky State University in Frankfort, Kentucky and he held that position for the 1927 season.  His career coaching record at Kentucky State was 0–2.

References

Year of birth missing
Year of death missing
Kentucky State Thorobreds football coaches